Morchella purpurascens, the purple morel, is an ascomycete fungus in the family Morchellaceae. It was first described as a variety of Morchella elata by Emile Boudier in 1897, based on a plate previously illustrated by Julius Vincenz von Krombholz. It was then recombined as a distinct species in 1985 by Emile Jacquetant, and validated the following year by Jacquetant and Bon. As with many other morel species, its taxonomical status remained for a long time a subject of debate, until an extensive phylogenetic and nomenclatural study in 2014 by Richard and colleagues confirmed this species' autonomy and matched it to phylogenetic lineage Mel-20.

The species is characterised by the pinkish or purplish colours on the cap of its young fruit bodies.

References

Fungi described in 1897
Fungi of Europe
purpurascens